New Clark City is a planned community currently undergoing development, located within the Clark Special Economic Zone in the towns of Bamban and Capas in Tarlac province, Philippines. It is owned and managed by the Bases Conversion and Development Authority (BCDA).

The New Clark City Sports Hub located within the National Government Administrative Center contains an athletes' village, an aquatics center and a 20,000-seater athletics stadium. New Clark City was one of the host cities of the 2019 Southeast Asian Games, which took place all over Luzon.  A list of major sporting events are given in the tables below in chronological order.

List of sporting events held

References

Sports in the Philippines